Alberta Ferretti is an Italian fashion designer and dressmaker.  She designs for her namesake brand Alberta Ferretti, and designed for Philosophy di Alberta Ferretti until 2014. Her showroom is in Milan, Italy but her studio is in her native village of Cattolica, near Rimini, Italy. She was among a group of Italian designers who were invited to a reception for 200 designers and retailers held by Prime Minister Margaret Thatcher at 10 Downing Street, in October 1988.

Early life 
In 1968, Alberta Ferretti opened her first boutique, called Jolly, in Cattolica. She designed a first collection in 1973 and co-founded  (a publicly traded clothing manufacturer and distributor) in 1976. She began showing seasonal collections on the runways of Milan in 1981. She launched Ferretti Jeans Philosophy in 1989, renamed Philosophy di Alberta Ferretti in 1994. In 1994 she renovated a 13th-century castle into the Palazzo Viviani hotel in Montegridolfo.

In October 1993 Ferretti presented clothes reminiscent of The Great Gatsby for the Milan ready-to-wear shows.
One of her designs was a long and trim gingham dress, in pale blue. A flapper showed a beige crocheted dress styled just above the knee. Her renditions of the toga for the production were diverse. They were simple gowns, some of them short, others 
long and draped.

Ferretti extended her the breadth of her company outside of Italy beginning with the acquisition of a building at 30 West 56th Street in New York City. She started Aeffe U.S.A., which produced and distributed clothing by Moschino, Rifat Ozbek, Jean Paul Gaultier, and Narcisco Rodriguez. Aeffe is owned by Ferretti and her brother, Massimo. The locale also became the hub for marketing her own collections.

By 1998 she opened in-store boutiques for selling her signature and Philosophy di Alberta Ferretti lines at Bergdorf Goodman. Next she obtained her initial American freestanding store in SoHo. This business, near Prince Street, is exclusively for her Philosophy collection. It is a lower priced edition of Ferretti's signature line, intended for younger women. In contrast to most designers, she started boutiques for her secondary lines prior to opening a flagship store for her
signature collection. Ferretti's West Broadway building is located next door to a Rizzoli bookstore. It is a Federal style architecture townhouse built in the late 19th century. It was renovated with a three-story glass front and skylights, so that the interior was filled with natural light. The store was designed by Manhattan architect David Ling. It is a pristinely white  shop. Ferretti signed a licensing deal with Procter & Gamble for a fragrance line in 2000.

Fashion career
Ferretti is known for her designs featuring twisting, tucking, and draping techniques. Her style employs a subtle layered look, sometimes showing a hint of hand-beaded gauze which extends slightly beneath the hem of a wool dress. The erotic qualities of the chiffon and jersey fashions she introduced for her spring 2008 fashion collection is evident in the look of her dresses. Many of them are cut high in the front and draped low in the back. Her target customer is the cocktail crowd. Specifically the dresses
are party frocks, above the knee, and enhanced by rhinestone rosettes and armour-like chain mail. Feretti's collection includes pleated bubbled coats, toga-like minidresses and skirts, and a sparse number of gowns of soft mint green and white hues.
The minidresses and skirts were shown with ethereal models wearing metallic gladiator flats.

In July 2011 her collection was presented at the catwalk of The Brandery fashion show in Barcelona.

She received the America Award of the Italy-USA Foundation in 2018.

References

External links

Fashion designers from Milan
Italian fashion designers
Italian women fashion designers
Living people
1950 births
People from the Province of Rimini